Ring, Ring de Banjo is a minstrel song written in 1851. The song's words and music are from Stephen Foster.

The song, written to mimic the dialect of Black people in the Southern United States, is about a newly-freed slave who wishes to come back to his master's plantation. As his old master is dying, the singer plays the banjo on his old master's deathbed until he dies. It is one of "minstrelsy's most explicit evocations of the potentially violent relationship in slavery between master and slave" and inspired a number of imitators, including the abolitionist Harriet Beecher Stowe.

References

American folk songs
Songs about musical instruments
Blackface minstrel songs
Songs written by Stephen Foster
1851 songs